{{safesubst:#invoke:RfD||2=Unipersonalist|month = February
|day = 17
|year = 2023
|time = 09:45
|timestamp = 20230217094522

|content=
REDIRECT Unitarian

}}